Shawnee Township is one of ten townships in Cape Girardeau County, Missouri, USA.  As of the 2000 census, its population was 3,460.

Shawnee Township was established in 1848, and named after the Shawnee Indians.

Geography
It contains two cemeteries: Apple Creek and Darby.

The streams of Blue Shawnee Creek, Buckeye Creek, Duskin Creek, Flatrock Creek, Indian Creek, Little Indian Creek, Lovejoy Creek, Muddy Shawnee Creek, Neelys Creek, Opossum Creek, Shawnee Creek and Turkey Creek run through this township.

References

 USGS Geographic Names Information System (GNIS)

External links
 US-Counties.com
 City-Data.com

Townships in Cape Girardeau County, Missouri
Cape Girardeau–Jackson metropolitan area
Townships in Missouri